AART architects is an architectural firm based in Aarhus, Denmark. The firm has been awarded for its work.

Selected projects

Completed
 Bikuben Kollegium, Copenhagen, Denmark
 Kulturværftet, Helsingør, Denmark (2011)
 Inspiria Science Centre, Norway

In progress
 Nautical School, Skagen, Denmark
 VUC, Haderslev, Denmark 
 Østfold Hospital, Sarpsborg, Østfold, Norway
 Campus Park Skara, Skara, Sweden

Awards
 2012 Arnstein Arneberg Prize for Inspiria Science Centre, Norway
 2012 Prime Property Award (Special Award) for Inspiria Science Centre

Gallery

References

External links

 Official website

Architecture firms of Denmark
Companies based in Aarhus